The women's  +67 kg competition of the taekwondo events at the 2011 Pan American Games took place on the 18 of October at the CODE II Gymnasium. The Taekwondo at the 2007 Pan American Games#Women's Heavyweight +67 kg Pan American Games champion is María del Rosario Espinoza of Mexico, while the defending Pan American Championship, champion is Guadalupe Ruiz also of Mexico.

Schedule
All times are Central Standard Time (UTC-6).

Results

Legend
PTG – Won by Points Gap
SUP – Won by Superiority
OT – Won on over time (Golden Point)

Main bracket

References

Taekwondo at the 2011 Pan American Games
Pan